Mostafa El Qasaa (born 25 April 1982) is a Lebanese former footballer who played as a striker.

References

External links

Mostafa El Qasaa at Liga Indonesia

1982 births
Living people
Lebanese footballers
Association football forwards
Lebanese expatriate footballers
Expatriate footballers in Indonesia
Lebanese expatriate sportspeople in Indonesia
Liga 1 (Indonesia) players
Persiba Balikpapan players
Lebanese Premier League players
AC Tripoli players